

Politics

 Assault weapon, a term used in American firearm legislation to define smallarms regulated or banned for their possession of certain features or presence on a list of named weapons.
 Assault weapons legislation in the United States, at federal, state, and local levels.

Weapon systems
 FGM-172 SRAW (Short-Range Assault Weapon)
 Heckler & Koch HK CAWS  (Close Assault Weapon System)
 Rifleman's Assault Weapon
 Shoulder-launched Multipurpose Assault Weapon
 Urban Assault Weapon